Nunspeet is a municipality and town in the central Netherlands. It has been an agricultural site since prehistoric times. The municipality contains a number of villages, namely Hulshorst, Elspeet, and Vierhouten. Nunspeet has a vivid historical foundation, called Nuwenspete.  In 1972 Nunspeet became a separate municipality after having been part of Ermelo before.

Recreation 
Nunspeet is a popular tourist area because it is surrounded by woods, holiday resorts and the former sea. Nunspeet has a town center which is located around the main market square. 

Nunspeet is situated on the shore of the Veluwemeer (Veluwe lake) which makes it popular for water leisure. There is also a small lake called "de Zandenplas" which is a popular recreational area in wooded sandy terrain.

Other tourist attractions include the weekly market and the town festival, De nacht van Nunspeet (Nunspeet Night) and the Eibertjesmarkt (Eibertjes market), as well as an annual sporting event called "de Keiler".

Population centres 
 Elspeet
 Hulshorst
 Nunspeet
 Vierhouten

Transport
 Nunspeet railway station

See also
 Round House

Notable people 
 Henry Van Asselt (1817 in Elspeet - 1902) a Dutch immigrant to the US, in the area that is now Seattle, Washington
 Tijs Tinbergen (born 1947 in Hulshorst) a Dutch filmmaker 
 Frank Berghuis (born 1967 in Nunspeet) a Dutch former footballer
 Leon Bolier (born 1980 in Nunspeet), also known by his mononym Bolier, is a Dutch classically trained trance composer, DJ and record producer

Gallery

References

External links

 
Municipalities of Gelderland
Populated places in Gelderland